Speth is a surname. Notable people with the surname include:

George Speth, American football player
Hans Speth, military commander
James Gustave Speth, American environmental lawyer and activist
Johann Speth, German composer
Ralf Speth, automotive executive

Other  
28800 Speth, minor planet